Abrama is a census town in navsari district in the Indian state of Gujarat.

Demographics
 India census, Abrama had a population of 21,035. Males constituted 53% of the population and females 47%. The average literacy rate was 78%, higher than the national average of 59.5%; with 57% of the males and 43% of females literate. 12% of the population was under 6 years of age.

Abrama is centre of many surrounding villages. There is one primary school, one high school with agriculture and technical departments and one engineering college. Abrama was known for its sea salt beds, with many people working in natural sea salt production. Abrama is very strong farming and agriculture. It produces verities of mangos, chickoo(Sapota), rise, sugarcanes and vegetables.

References

Cities and towns in Valsad district